Masullas, Masuddas in sardinian language, is a comune (municipality) in the Province of Oristano in the Italian region Sardinia, located about  northwest of Cagliari and about  southeast of Oristano.

Masullas borders the following municipalities: Gonnoscodina, Gonnostramatza, Mogoro, Morgongiori, Pompu, Simala, Siris, Uras.

References

Cities and towns in Sardinia